WGNB (89.3 FM) is a radio station broadcasting a religious format. Licensed to Zeeland, Michigan, it previously broadcast under the WXYB call sign.

References
Michiguide.com - WGNB History

External links

Moody Radio
Zeeland, Michigan
Radio stations established in 1987
GNB